Albert Heilmann (6 June 1886 Munich – 20 December 1949 Berlin-Wilmersdorf) was an architect and contractor who worked in Munich and Berlin.

From 1909 to 1929 he was junior boss of his father Jakob Heilmann's construction company, Heilmann & Littmann. Later he became chairman of the board of supervisors of this company, after it had been transformed into a corporation.

He constructed the Europahaus (House of Europe) in Berlin, in which the German Federal Ministry for Economic Cooperation and Development is currently located, in cooperation with the Berlin building tycoon Heinrich Mendelssohn.

Works 
 Heilmann, Albert (in German): Das Europa-Haus in Berlin : Ein neuzeitl. Grossbau ; Seine Entstehgsgeschichte vom ersten Spatenstich bis zur Vollendg (The Europa-Haus in Berlin. A modern large building. Its history of origin, from its ground-breaking ceremony to its completion) Berlin: Ascher 1931.

External links 
 Photos on Albert Heilmann from www.jakob-heilmann.de
 

1886 births
1949 deaths
Architects from Munich
20th-century German architects